Windeberg is a village and quarter of the town of Mühlhausen in Thuringia, central Germany.

Geography 
The Forstberg ( above NN) lies to the south and the Flachstal (Flax Valley) nature reserve to the west. There are transport links via the Landesstraßen (state's roads) 1016 and 2041.

History 

The village was first mentioned in a document on 29 August 1296.
For centuries, it belonged to the sphere of influence of the Reichsstadt (imperial city) of Mühlhausen. In 1565, the (male) population of Windeberg was 45.
In 1750, much of the village, including the village church, fell victim to a fire.
In 1802, Windeberg, together with Mühlhausen, fell to the Kingdom of Prussia, from 1807 to 1813 to the Kingdom of Westphalia (canton Dachrieden) created by Napoleon, and after the Congress of Vienna in 1816, it was assigned to the Landkreis Mühlhausen i. Th. in the Prussian Province of Saxony.
On 1 June 1992, Windeberg was incorporated into Mühlhausen.

Sights 
 
 Memorial for the victims of both world wars in the churchyard in front of the village church

References

External links 

Mühlhausen
Former municipalities in Thuringia